Feet of Clay may refer to:
Feet of clay, a hidden weak point that could cause the downfall of someone who appears strong or invincible
The Feet of Clay, a 1882 novel by Ellen Martin
Feet of Clay, a 1917 film starring Barney Furey
Feet of Clay (1924 film), a 1924 silent film directed by Cecil B. DeMille that is now believed to be lost
Feet of Clay (1960 film), a 1960 British film produced by Danziger Productions
Feet of Clay (2007 film), a 2007 short film produced by Daisy 3 Pictures
Feet of Clay (novel), a 1996 Discworld novel by Terry Pratchett
"Feet of Clay", an 1893 short story by Kate McPhelim Cleary
"Feet of Clay", a 1950 short story by P. G. Wodehouse
Feet of Clay (EP), a 2019 EP by Earl Sweatshirt